Mendelssohn Inlet is an ice-filled inlet,  long and  wide, situated between Derocher Peninsula and Eroica Peninsula on the north side of Beethoven Peninsula, in the southwest part of Alexander Island, Antarctica. The inlet was first sighted from the air and roughly mapped by the United States Antarctic Service, 1939–41, and was resighted and photographed from the air by the Ronne Antarctic Research Expedition (RARE), 1947–48. It was remapped from the RARE photos by D. Searle of the Falkland Islands Dependencies Survey in 1960, and named by the UK Antarctic Place-Names Committee after German composer Felix Mendelssohn.

See also

 Haydn Inlet
 Verdi Inlet
 Weber Inlet

Further reading 
 Defense Mapping Agency  1992, Sailing Directions (planning Guide) and (enroute) for Antarctica, P 379
 Ted A. Scambos, Christina Hulbe, Mark Fahnestock, Jennifer Bohlander, The link between climate warming and break-up of ice shelves in the Antarctic Peninsula, Journal of Glaciology, Volume 46, Issue 154, 2000, pp. 516–530, DOI: https://doi.org/10.3189/172756500781833043

External links 

 Mendelssohn Inlet on USGS website
 Mendelssohn Inlet on SCAR website

References

Inlets of Alexander Island
Felix Mendelssohn